Ljungström air preheater is an air preheater invented by the Swedish engineer Fredrik Ljungström (1875-1964). The patent was achieved in 1930.

Even in a modern utility boiler the preheater provides up to 20 percent of the total heat transfer in the boiler process, but only represents two percent of the investment. 

The factory and workshop activities and laboratories in Lidingö would remain throughout the 1920s, with some 70 personnel. In the 1930s it was used as a film studio, and was finally demolished in the 1970s to give space for new industry premises.

Fredrik Ljungström's technology of the air preheater is implemented in a vast number of modern power stations around the world until this day, with total attributed worldwide fuel savings estimated at 4,960,000,000 tons of oil, "few inventions have been as successful in saving fuel as the Ljungström Air Preheater".

In 1995, the Ljungström air preheater was distinguished as the 44th International Historic Mechanical Engineering Landmark by the American Society of Mechanical Engineers.

References

External links
 History of the Ljungström Air Preheater
 LJUNGSTRÖM Air Preheater (APH) & Gas-gas Heater (GGH) Power Plant Overview

Chemical equipment
Mechanical engineering
Power station technology
Engineering thermodynamics
Ljungström